Shoresh (lit. Root) is a moshav shitufi in central Israel. Located five kilometres from Sha'ar HaGai in the Jerusalem corridor, it falls under the jurisdiction of Mateh Yehuda Regional Council.

History
On 15 April 1948, the Harel Brigade captured the Arab village of Saris overlooking the highway to Jerusalem. The strategic hilltop position had been used to fire on Jewish vehicles travelling on the road below. Later that year, a group of immigrants from Eastern Europe founded a kibbutz on the site, adapting the name of Arab village. Four years later, it became a moshav. Today Shoresh operates a hotel, conference center and banquet hall.

In July 1995, a fire destroyed the moshav's poultry and orchard industries, damaged the hotel, and left over half the moshav members homeless.

Notable residents
Anastasia Gloushkov, Olympic synchronized swimmer
Matan Vilnai
Eli Avidar

References

Moshavim
Former kibbutzim
Populated places established in 1948
Populated places in Jerusalem District
1948 establishments in Israel